Benton Museum may refer to:

Benton Museum of Art at Pomona College
William Benton Museum of Art at the University of Connecticut